The Pakistan International is an international badminton tournament held in Pakistan organised by Pakistan Badminton Federation. In 2004, this tournament known as Pakistan Satellite and the International Badminton Federation has graded the tournament with "A grade" and its points would be included in world ranking. This tournament also became the stage for Pakistani players to compete and see their performance in international event.

Previous winners

Performances by nation

References

External links 
 BWF Tournament
 Badminton Asia
 Pakistan Badminton Federation

Badminton tournaments
Badminton tournaments in Pakistan
Sports competitions in Pakistan
Recurring sporting events established in 2004
2004 establishments in Pakistan